The Federation of State Medical Boards (FSMB) of the United States is a national non-profit organization that represents the 71 state medical and osteopathic boards of the United States and its territories and co-sponsors the United States Medical Licensing Examination. Medical boards license physicians, investigate complaints, discipline those who violate the law, conduct physician evaluations, and facilitate the rehabilitation of physicians where appropriate. The FSMB's mission calls for "continual improvement in the quality, safety and integrity of health care through the development and promotion of high standards for physician licensure and practice."

Based in Euless, Texas and Washington, D.C., the FSMB serves as the national voice for its member boards and is a recognized authority throughout the United States and internationally on issues related to medical licensure and discipline.

The United States Medical Licensing Examination (USMLE) is a three-step (three-part) professional examination for medical licensure that is sponsored by the FSMB and the National Board of Medical Examiners (NBME).

History
The Tenth Amendment to the United States Constitution authorizes states to establish laws and regulations protecting the health, safety and general welfare of their citizens. Medicine is a regulated profession in the United States because of the potential harm to the public if an incompetent or impaired physician is licensed to practice.

To protect the public from the unprofessional, improper, unlawful, fraudulent and/or incompetent practice of medicine, each of the 50 states, the District of Columbia and the U.S. territories (Puerto Rico, Guam, the Commonwealth of the Northern Mariana Islands, and the U.S. Virgin Islands) has a medical practice act that defines the practice of medicine and delegates the authority to enforce the law to a state medical board. By following up on complaints, medical boards also give the public a way to enforce basic standards of competence and ethical behavior in their physicians, and physicians a way to protect the integrity of their profession. State medical boards also adopt policies and guidelines related to the practice of medicine. However, medical boards sometimes engage in the unethical practice of sham peer review.

The FSMB was founded in 1912 through a merger between the National Confederation of State Medical Examining and Licensing Boards (established in 1891) and the American Confederation of Reciprocating Examining and Licensing Boards (established in 1902). The founding of the FSMB coincides with the national impact of the Flexner Report, which was published in 1910 by the Carnegie Foundation and led to dramatic changes in medical education.

In 1915 the FSMB began publication of the Monthly Bulletin, the first regular publication since the Quarterly, which ceased publication after the first volume. The FSMB was unique in that it was the first group to publish the names of disciplined physicians in its Monthly Bulletin. In 1920 or 1921 the name of the publication was changed to Federation Bulletin and publication continued monthly. The year 1993 saw the development of a new, larger format for the publication, which was called the Journal of Medical Licensure and Discipline. In 2010, the journal was renamed the Journal of Medical Regulation.

Since its establishment, the FSMB has initiated and strengthened cooperation among state medical boards and facilitated collaborative efforts between state medical boards and other entities. All 71 medical boards of the United States and its territories, including the 14 state boards of osteopathic medicine, belong to the FSMB. Members of these boards are known as Fellows of the FSMB, so long as they are serving as members of a member medical board and for a period of 36 months thereafter, and many of them have been prominent in the affairs of numerous other major medical organizations in the United States. The FSMB is a parent organization of the Accreditation Council for Continuing Medical Education (ACCME) and the Educational Commission for Foreign Medical Graduates (ECFMG). It was a founding member of what was to become the American Board of Medical Specialties (ABMS) and remains an associate member of that body.

The FSMB's Chief Executive Officers since the organization's inception have been George H. Matson, (1912), Otto V. Huffman, (1912–1915), Walter L. Bierring, (1915–1961), Stiles D. Ezell, (1961), Harold E. Jervey Jr., (1961–1962, 1977–1984), McKinley H. Crabb, (1962–1977), Bryant L. Galusha, (1984–1989), James R. Winn, (1989–2001), Dale L. Austin, M.A. (2001–2002), James N. Thompson, (2002–2008) and Barbara S. Schneidman, (2009). Humayun Chaudhry began his tenure as President and CEO on October 19, 2009.

Organization

Leadership

Board of directors 
The federation is run by a board of directors which is elected by the 71 member state and territorial medical regulatory authorities within the federation. As of 2022:

 Sarvam TerKonda - Chair
 Jeffrey Carter - Chair-elect
 Jone Geimer-Flanders - Treasurer
 Kenneth Simons - Immediate Past Chair
 Humayun Chaudhry - Secretary; President and CEO

Members

USMLE Examination

The United States Medical Licensing Examination (USMLE) is sponsored by the FSMB.  The USMLE must be passed before a Doctor of Medicine with an M.D. degree can obtain a license to practice medicine in the United States.

Activities
The FSMB is guided in its actions and activities by its House of Delegates, in which every member board is represented. Its activities include conducting or commissioning research to determine whether an emerging trend in medical practice requires the attention of its member boards; developing and updating policy guidelines to reflect the impact of scientific advances, new technologies and changing cultural attitudes; helping member boards carry out their duties as regulators of the medical profession through educational meetings, programs, and seminars; representing its member boards in a growing number of collaborations as new medical knowledge and new technologies demand work across old boundaries; serving as a national and international spokesperson on issues related to medical regulation and discipline; and conducting outreach to the public around new initiatives and responding to calls from the media, editors and concerned citizens.

Foundation 
The FSMB Foundation (formerly the FSMB Education and Research Foundation) is the philanthropic arm of the FSMB and makes financial grants for education and research projects that support the work of the state medical boards. The Foundation, as a 501(c)(3) organization, can compete for external grant funds and, when appropriate, direct them back to state medical boards in the form of grants that address education and research needs. In April 2006, the FSMB Foundation was awarded a grant to develop online physician education. The Online Prescriber Education Network portal now offers 32 available educational courses.

Starting in 2013, the foundation has hosted an annual luncheon which has raised thousands of dollars to support Foundation activities, including research into how states addressed the COVID-19 pandemic. In April 2022, the foundation held its 10th Anniversary luncheon.

Services

The FSMB's Federation Physician Data Center (FPDC) provides comprehensive information on regulatory actions and other vital information reported against physicians. It offers two services to assist medical boards in their credentialing efforts: the Board Action Data Bank Search and the Disciplinary Alert Service, both of which are considered primary source equivalents by NCQA, URAC and the Joint Commission. The FPDC permits medical boards to view a consolidated national record of disciplinary actions taken against a physician dating back to the early 1960s. Actions by medical boards and governmental agencies include revocation, suspension or denial of license renewal. Through the FPDC's Disciplinary Alert Service, the FSMB electronically notifies all member boards within 48 hours when any member board reports a disciplinary action against a physician or physician assistant. A similar service advises hospitals and managed care organizations when one of their physicians has been disciplined. The FPDC is routinely consulted by licensing and disciplinary boards; military, governmental and private agencies; and organizations involved in the employment and/or credentialing of physicians. The FPDC also serves state medical boards as a back-up repository, both in hard copy and electronic files, of their disciplinary action data. In case of emergencies or local system failures, member boards can recreate all of their physician discipline files through the FPDC. During the immediate aftermath of the effects of Hurricane Katrina in 2005, the staff of the FSMB and its members boards worked together to expedite medical care for victims while simultaneously protecting the public from dangerous doctors or imposter physicians.

The FSMB's Federation Credentials Verification Service (FCVS), created in 1996, provides a permanent repository for the core credentials of physicians and physician assistants. In February 2009, FCVS received its 100,000th physician applicant.

The Post-Licensure Assessment System (PLAS) is a joint program of the FSMB and the National Board of Medical Examiners. The PLAS provides comprehensive services to medical licensing authorities for use in assessing the ongoing competence of licensed or previously licensed physicians. Such services benefit state medical boards, hospitals and other organizations interested in ensuring that physicians who are providing patient care are competent to do so.

The FSMB publishes both electronic and print materials to inform member boards, physicians and the public about medical licensing, regulation, discipline and medical trends. The FSMB's quarterly flagship publication, the Journal of Medical Licensure and Discipline, is not currently indexed by PubMed, as was its predecessor, the "Federal Bulletin." A monthly newsletter, FSMB Newsline, and a weekly e-mail publication, BoardNet News, keep member boards and their staff up to date.

Controversies

Pharmaceutical funding 
The FSMB Foundation developed Responsible Opioid Prescribing: A Physician's Guide, a book written by Scott M. Fishman, that translates the FSMB's Model Policy for the Use of Controlled Substances for the Treatment of Pain into pragmatic implementation strategies for risk reduction of addiction, abuse and diversion, patient education and monitoring. In February 2012, MedPage Today revealed that the FSMB sought $100,000 in funding from Purdue Pharma to pay for the printing and distribution costs of the book.

See also
 International Association of Medical Colleges

References

External links
 Official website for the Federation of State Medical Boards

Medical and health organizations based in Texas